Optioservus is a genus of riffle beetles in the family Elmidae. There are about 13 described species in Optioservus.

Species
 Optioservus browni White, 1978 (Brown's optioservus riffle beetle)
 Optioservus canus Chandler, 1954 (pinnacles optioservus riffle beetle)
 Optioservus castanipennis (Fall, 1925)
 Optioservus divergens (LeConte, 1874)
 Optioservus fastiditus (LeConte, 1850)
 Optioservus heteroclitus White, 1978
 Optioservus immunis (Fall, 1925)
 Optioservus ovalis (LeConte, 1863)
 Optioservus phaeus White, 1978 (Scott optioservus riffle beetle)
 Optioservus quadrimaculatus (Horn, 1870)
 Optioservus sandersoni Collier, 1972
 Optioservus seriatus (LeConte, 1874)
 Optioservus trivittatus (Brown, 1930)

References

Further reading

 
 
 

Elmidae